Silvija Erdelji (Serbian Cyrillic: Силвија Ердељи, Hungarian: Erdélyi Szilvia; May 28, 1979 in Senta) is a Serbian table tennis player.

She won 2 bronze medals, in singles and doubles, at the 2003 European Table Tennis Championship. Erdelji competed at the 2004 Summer Olympics in Athens, Greece. In 2005, she became Mediterranean doubles champion.

She was named as Serbia and Montenegro Sportswoman of The Year 2003. Erdelji is of Hungarian ethnicity.

External links
 Silvija Erdelji Sports Reference 

1979 births
Living people
People from Senta
Serbian female table tennis players
Olympic table tennis players of Serbia and Montenegro
Table tennis players at the 2004 Summer Olympics
Mediterranean Games gold medalists for Serbia
Competitors at the 2005 Mediterranean Games
Mediterranean Games medalists in table tennis
20th-century Serbian women
21st-century Serbian women